MOS:THE may refer to several parts of the Wikipedia Manual of Style that address usage (especially capitalization) of the definite article:

 MOS:THECAPS – 
 MOS:NICKNAMETHE – part of 
 MOS:THEINST – part of 
 MOS:THEMUSIC – 
 MOS:THETITLE – 
 MOS:TMTHE – part of

See also 

 WP:THE – Wikipedia:Naming conventions (definite or indefinite article at beginning of name)